Sutter Health is a not-for-profit integrated health delivery system headquartered in Sacramento, California. It operates 24 acute care hospitals and over 200 clinics in Northern California.

Sutter Hospital Association was founded in 1921 as a response to the 1918 flu pandemic. Named for nearby Sutter's Fort, its first hospital opened in 1923. Later known as Sutter Community Hospitals, the organization eventually merged with several struggling hospitals in the surrounding area.

History

Origins 
The organization takes its name from one of Sacramento’s original European settlements, Sutter's Fort, built by California pioneer John Sutter. In response to the 1918 flu pandemic, community leaders constructed the first Sutter Hospital in the vicinity of the fort, replacing an old adobe house that had previously served as a makeshift hospital. Sutter Medical Center, Sacramento occupies this site today.

Other Sutter Health hospitals date back to the 1800s and were some of Northern California's earliest healthcare providers. For example, California Pacific Medical Center in San Francisco was formed out of the successive hospital and medical school mergers dating back to the city's earliest days of organized medicine. The predecessor of today's Sutter Santa Rosa Regional Hospital opened its doors to residents of Sonoma County in 1866.

Many of the health care facilities that eventually became part of the Sutter Health network were created as charitable hospitals by community members in cities coping with growing populations, epidemics, fires, floods and earthquakes.

Late 20th Century
Government cutbacks, the advent of managed care, and other financial pressures fueled an increase in hospital and physician organization mergers, acquisitions, and affiliations. By 1995, Sutter Health had grown to include 18 affiliated hospitals, seven medical foundations (physician organizations), and numerous outpatient care centers throughout Northern California.

In 1986, Pacific Presbyterian Medical Center in San Francisco, Mills-Peninsula Hospital in San Mateo, and Marin General Hospital in Greenbrae created an affiliation known as California Healthcare System (CHS). Berkeley-based Alta Bates Corporation (now known as Alta Bates Summit Medical Center) joined CHS in 1992, the same year that saw the creation of California Pacific Medical Center, formed through a merger of Pacific Presbyterian and Children's Hospital of San Francisco.

In January 1996, California Healthcare System merged with Sutter Health.

21st Century
The new century brought advances in healthcare technology. Sutter Health was among the first health systems in the United States to install barcode medication safety technology and an electronic intensive care unit.

In 2010, Sutter Health reorganized its hospitals and medical foundations into five regions: Central Valley, Sacramento Sierra, East Bay, West Bay, and Peninsula Coastal. In November 2014, it announced further operational integration of its five operating units into two: Bay Area and Valley Area.

In 2016, Sutter Health became the jersey sponsor of the San Jose Earthquakes. In 2019, the Sacramento River Cats stadium was renamed Sutter Health Park.

Hospitals and Clinics

Sutter Health consists of 24 acute care hospitals and five medical foundations, plus specialized centers for surgery, cancer care, cardiac care, rehab, and home care. As of 2015, Sutter Health organizes most operations into two geographic units.

Sutter Bay Hospitals 

Alta Bates Summit Medical Center (East Bay)
Alta Bates Campus (Ashby)
Herrick Campus
Summit Campus
California Pacific Medical Center (San Francisco)
Davies Campus
Mission Bernal Campus
Van Ness Campus
Eden Medical Center (Castro Valley)
 Mills-Peninsula Medical Center
Novato Community Hospital
Sutter Delta Medical Center (Antioch)
Sutter Lakeside Hospital (Lakeport)
 Sutter Maternity & Surgery Center of Santa Cruz
 Sutter Santa Rosa Regional Hospital

Sutter Valley Hospitals 

 Memorial Hospital Los Banos
Memorial Medical Center (Modesto)
 Sutter Amador Hospital (Jackson)
 Sutter Auburn Faith Hospital
 Sutter Davis Hospital
Sutter Medical Center, Sacramento
 Sutter Center for Psychiatry (Sacramento)
 Sutter Roseville Medical Center
 Sutter Solano Medical Center (Vallejo)
 Sutter Surgical Hospital North Valley (Yuba City)
Sutter Tracy Community Hospital

Sutter Bay Medical Foundation 

Palo Alto Medical Foundation (PAMF)
Sutter East Bay Medical Foundation
Sutter Pacific Medical Foundation

Sutter Valley Medical Foundation 

 Sutter Gould Medical Foundation
 Sutter Medical Foundation

Other Services 

 Kahi Mohala Behavioral Health ('Ewa Beach, Hawaii)
 Sutter Care at Home
Sutter Coast Hospital (Crescent City)
 Sutter Coast Health (Brookings, Oregon)
Sutter Urgent Care
Sutter Walk-In Care
In 2010, Marin General Hospital (now MarinHealth Medical Center) left Sutter Health to operate independently under the Marin Healthcare District.

Notable services
Sutter Health doctors and hospitals provide a variety of clinical services including cancer care, complementary medicine, diabetes care, heart care, children's health, home health/hospice, mental health care, orthopedics, pregnancy and childbirth, sleep disorders, transplant services, and weight loss surgery (bariatrics).

Sutter Health affiliates have been nationally recognized for cardiac care, neonatology, transplant care, and neurosurgery.

Until the opening of UCSF Benioff Children's Hospital's pediatric emergency department in 2013, Sutter ran the only pediatric emergency department in San Francisco.

Scout by Sutter Health is a 12-week, nonclinical program targeted at people aged 12 to 26 designed to help them deal with anxiety, depression, and stress.  It has weekly screenings for anxiety and depression.  Personalized content is determined by their responses to the screenings. Modules are also sent to caregivers, mostly parents. Exercises are offered.  Nonclinical guides are provided by Boston-based Docent Health.  In 2022 Ada Health was integrated into the program.

Quality
Sutter Health doctors and hospitals participate in voluntary and mandatory programs that publicly report patient satisfaction, cost, utilization, and quality of care measures. These include Hospital Compare, California Healthcare Foundation, California Office of the Patient Advocate, and The Leapfrog Group.

Sutter Health-affiliated hospitals and medical groups have been recognized by several independent healthcare quality organizations. For example:
 2016, Truven Health Analytics named Sutter Health among the top-performing health systems in the country in its 15 Top Health Systems® study.
 2013, Sutter Davis Hospital became the first Northern California hospital to receive the Malcolm Baldrige National Quality Award, the nation's highest presidential honor for performance excellence through innovation, improvement, and visionary leadership.
2009, the Lewin Group ranked Sutter Health as the top healthcare system in California for quality.
 2009, SDI Health ranked Sutter Health fifth among the "Top 100" integrated healthcare networks in the United States.
 2008, the Integrated Healthcare Association recognized several Sutter Health affiliates for accomplishments in areas of clinical care including heart care, preventive care, chronic care management, pneumonia, patient satisfaction and use of information technology.
 2007, the Adaptive Business Leaders organization named Sutter Health's eICU as the most innovative approach to health care delivery.

In 2014, the Brookings Institution and The Atlantic wrote about Sutter Health's nationally recognized Advanced Illness Management program, which improves quality of life for patients with advanced, chronic illness, reduces unnecessary hospitalizations, and makes care more cost-effective. 

In 2015, NPR in Los Angeles reported that the Sutter Health network doctors are standardizing treatment and testing options to make care more consistent and help reduce overall costs for patients while maintaining care quality.

Legal actions
In 2004, Sutter Health implemented a systemwide policy for charity care and health care discounts for uninsured and underinsured patients. In 2006 Sutter Health expanded its policy to offer automatic discounts to uninsured patients. Later, along with several other health systems, it reached settlement agreements in class-action lawsuits related to the billing of uninsured patients.

In 2014, the United Food and Commercial Workers (UFCW) union & Employers Benefit Trust (UEBT) filed a class action antitrust lawsuit against Sutter Health. In 2018, the Attorney General of California filed a lawsuit against Sutter Health, alleging antitrust. The Attorney General and UFCW ultimately settled their combined cases out of court in December 2019. Under the terms of the settlement, Sutter was not required to admit wrongdoing, but will pay plaintiffs $575 million in damages, and has agreed to significantly change its anti-competitive business practices.

Labor relations
Sutter Health's physician organizations, hospitals, home health, and other services have nearly 60 locally negotiated collective bargaining agreements with more than one dozen different labor unions. Approximately 13,700 employees have elected to work under labor union contracts. In April of 2022 over 8,000 nurses and other healthcare workers in 15 Northern California Sutter Health facilities represented by California Nurses Association and affiliates struck for one day, asking for "safer staffing levels" and other contract demands. Sutter locked out the striking workers for a week.

See also 

 Healthcare in California

References

External links
 Sutter Health Web site

 
Hospital networks in the United States
Medical and health organizations based in California
Hospitals in California
Healthcare in California